Cicadatra is a genus of European and Asian cicadas; it was erected by Kolenati in 1857 and is typical of the tribe Cicadatrini.

Species

The following are included by the Global Biodiversity Information Facility:

 Cicadatra abdominalis Schumacher, 1923
 Cicadatra acberi (Distant, 1888)
 Cicadatra adanai Kartal, 1980
 Cicadatra alhageos (Kolenati, 1857)
 Cicadatra anoea (Walker, 1850)
 Cicadatra appendiculata Linnavuori, 1954
 Cicadatra ashrafi Ahmed, Sanborn & Akhter, 2013
 Cicadatra atra (Olivier, 1790) - type species
 Cicadatra barbodi Mozaffarian & Sanborn, 2013
 Cicadatra bistunensis Mozaffarian & Sanborn, 2010
 Cicadatra erkowitensis Linnavuori, 1973
 Cicadatra flavicollis Horváth, 1911
 Cicadatra genoina Dlabola, 1979
 Cicadatra gingat China, 1926
 Cicadatra gregoryi China, 1925
 Cicadatra hagenica Dlabola, 1987
 Cicadatra hei Wang, He & Wei, 2017
 Cicadatra hyalina (Fabricius, 1798)
 Cicadatra hyalinata (Brullé, 1832)
 Cicadatra icari Simões, Sanborn & Quartau, 2013
 Cicadatra inconspicua Distant, 1912
 Cicadatra karachiensis Ahmed, Sanborn & Hill, 2010
 Cicadatra karpathosensis Simões, Sanborn & Quartau, 2013
 Cicadatra kermanica Dlabola, 1970
 Cicadatra longipennis Schumacher, 1923
 Cicadatra lorestanica Mozaffarian & Sanborn, 2010
 Cicadatra mirzayansi Dlabola, 1981
 Cicadatra naja Dlabola, 1979
 Cicadatra pallasi Schumacher, 1923
 Cicadatra pazukii Mozaffarian & Sanborn, 2015
 Cicadatra persica Kirkaldy, 1909
 Cicadatra platyptera Fieber, 1876
 Cicadatra raja Distant, 1906
 Cicadatra ramanensis Linnavuori, 1962
 Cicadatra reinhardi Kartal, 1980
 Cicadatra sankara (Distant, 1904)
 Cicadatra serresi (Meunier, 1915)
 Cicadatra shaluensis China, 1925
 Cicadatra shapur Dlabola, 1981
 Cicadatra tandojamensis Ahmed, Sanborn & Akhter, 2013
 Cicadatra tenebrosa Fieber, 1876
 Cicadatra vulcania Dlabola & Heller, 1962
 Cicadatra walkeri Metcalf, 1963
 Cicadatra xantes (Walker, 1850)
 Cicadatra zahedanica Dlabola, 1970
 Cicadatra ziaratica Ahmed, Sanborn & Akhter, 2012

References

External Links

Cicadidae genera
Cicadinae
Hemiptera of Asia
Hemiptera of Europe